Hypermetabolism is defined as an elevated resting energy expenditure (REE) > 110% of predicted REE. Hypermetabolism is accompanied by a variety of internal and external symptoms, most notably extreme weight loss, and can also be a symptom in itself. This state of increased metabolic activity can signal underlying issues, especially hyperthyroidism. Patients with Fatal familial insomnia, an extremely rare and strictly hereditary disorder, also presents with hypermetabolism; however, this universally fatal disorder is exceedingly rare, with only a few known cases worldwide. The drastic impact of the hypermetabolic state on patient nutritional requirements is often understated or overlooked as well.

Signs and symptoms
Symptoms may last for days, weeks, or months until the disorder is healed. The most apparent sign of hypermetabolism is an abnormally high intake of calories followed by continuous weight loss. Internal symptoms of hypermetabolism include: peripheral insulin resistance, elevated catabolism of protein, carbohydrates and triglycerides, and a negative nitrogen balance in the body. 
Outward symptoms of hypermetabolism may include:
 Weight loss
 Anemia
 Fatigue
 Elevated heart rate
 Irregular heartbeat
 Insomnia
 Dysautonomia
 Shortness of breath
 Muscle weakness
 Excessive sweating

Pathophysiology
During the acute phase, the liver redirects protein synthesis, causing up-regulation of certain proteins and down-regulation of others. Measuring the serum level of proteins that are up- and down-regulated during the acute phase can reveal extremely important information about the patient's nutritional state. The most important up-regulated protein is C-reactive protein, which can rapidly increase 20- to 1,000-fold during the acute phase.
Hypermetabolism also causes expedited catabolism of carbohydrates, proteins, and triglycerides in order to meet the increased metabolic demands.

Diagnosis
Quantitation by indirect calorimetry, as opposed to the Harris-Benedict equation, is needed to accurately measure REE in cancer patients.

Differential diagnosis

Many different illnesses can cause an increase in metabolic activity as the body combats illness and disease in order to heal itself.
Hypermetabolism is a common symptom of various pathologies. Some of the most prevalent diseases characterized by hypermetabolism are listed below.
 Hyperthyroidism: Manifestation: An overactive thyroid often causes a state of increased metabolic activity.
 Friedreich's ataxia: Manifestation: Local cerebral metabolic activity is increased extensively as the disease progresses. 
 Fatal familial insomnia: Manifestation: Hypermetabolism in the thalamus occurs and disrupts sleep spindle formation that occurs there.
 Graves' disease: Manifestation: Excess hypermetabolically-induced thyroid hormone activates sympathetic pathways, causing the eyelids to retract and remain constantly elevated.
 Anorexia and bulimia: Manifestation: The prolonged stress put on the body as a result of these eating disorders forces the body into starvation mode. Some patients recovering from these disorders experience hypermetabolism until they resume normal diets. 
 Astrocytoma: Manifestation: Causes hypermetabolic lesions in the brain

Treatment
Ibuprofen, polyunsaturated fatty acids, and beta-blockers have been reported in some preliminary studies to decrease REE, which may allow patients to meet their caloric needs and gain weight.

References

Metabolism